The Whitney gang were a notorious family gang from the Anfield district of Liverpool. In November 2011, the family and their associates were sentenced to a total of 82 years in prison for conspiracy to supply Class A drugs, with individual sentences ranging from two to nine years.

Members

Whitney family
 Carol Whitney
 Leslie Whitney
 Lisa Whitney
 Paul Whitney
 Anthony "Tony" Whitney 
 Gary Whitney (deceased 2006)

Associates
 Emma Mackenzie
 Mary McCabe
 Gary Edwards
 Thomas Dowd deceased
 Michael O'Toole
 Matthew Nayor
 Neil Brady
 Craig Rees
 Rodney Rees
 Wayne Hincks
 Michael Waters

Conviction and imprisonment
All members were jailed for a total of 82 years in November 2011. The last member to be extradited from Spain was Anthony "Tony" Whitney from his home in Dénia where he got mixed up in another smuggling plot, and was apprehended for smuggling 50,000 tablets of an ecstasy-type substance. Emma Mackenzie was sentenced to 834 days in prison – a "significantly shorter and more lenient sentence" than she could have expected if not for her two-year-old daughter. She was subsequently released from court, having already served half her sentence on remand.

References

Organizations established in the 1980s
1980s establishments in England
Organizations disestablished in 2011
2011 disestablishments in England
Organised crime groups in England
Gangs in Liverpool